
Monson may refer to:

People
 Monson (surname)
 Baron Monson
 Monson baronets

Places

United States
 Monson, California
 Monson, Maine
 Monson, Massachusetts
 Monson High School
 Monson Township, Traverse County, Minnesota
 Monson, West Virginia
 Monson Lake State Park, Minnesota

Elsewhere
 Mount Monson, Antarctica